C13 is an untarred regional road in southern Namibia.

ǁKaras Region
Roads in Namibia